Infinite AIS Cycling Team is a Thai road bicycle racing team. It was known in 2014 as Singha Infinite Cycling Team, Singha is a Thai Boon Rawd Brewery was the first of its kind in Thailand, and produces beer under the Singha brand name. Infinite is a Thai bicycle manufacturer. The team is a member of the UCI Continental cycling team.

History
For the 2014 season the team rode Infinite bikes.

Team roster

Major results

2014
Overall The Haute Route, Peter Pouly
Stages 1, 2 & 3, Peter Pouly
Overall Tour de Ijen, Peter Pouly
Stage 1, Kyosuke Takei
Stage 3, Peter Pouly
2015
Overall Tour de Ijen, Peter Pouly
Stage 3, Peter Pouly

Cycling in Thailand